Jude Wellings (born April 26, 2006) is an American professional soccer player who plays as a midfielder for Major League Soccer club Real Salt Lake.

Club career

Youth
Wellings joined the Real Salt Lake academy in the summer of 2020. Wellings went on to captain the under-15's team that went on to win the 2021 MLS NEXT Cup, then transitioned to the under-17 level, scoring five goals and tallying two assists in 12 appearances, and was named MLS NEXT Best Player of the Tournament. He made two appearances for Salt Lake's USL Championship affiliate side Real Monarchs during their 2021 season, debuting as a 74th-minute substitute during a 1–3 loss to Rio Grande Valley FC on October 27, 2021.

Real Salt Lake
On January 10, 2022, Wellings signed a homegrown player deal with Real Salt Lake through to 2025, with a club option to extend to 2026.

Career statistics

References

External links
 Profile at Real Salt Lake

2006 births
American soccer players
Association football midfielders
Homegrown Players (MLS)
Living people
People from Birmingham, Michigan
Real Monarchs players
Real Salt Lake players
Soccer players from Michigan
United States men's youth international soccer players
USL Championship players
MLS Next Pro players